Arodnieks was a newspaper published from Riga, Latvia between 1920 and 1934. The frequency of publication varied from fortnightly to weekly. The circulation of the newspaper was between 2,000-5,000 copies per issue. Initially it was an organ of the Riga trade unions, later it became the organ of the Central Bureau of Latvian Trade Unions. Ernests Morics served as the editor-in-chief of the newspaper.

Arodnieks had a fortnightly Russian language sister newspaper, Trudovaya Zhizn.

References

Defunct newspapers published in Latvia
Latvian-language newspapers
Mass media in Riga
Newspapers published in Latvia
Newspapers established in 1920
Publications disestablished in 1934
Socialist newspapers
1920 establishments in Latvia
1934 disestablishments in Latvia